This page indexes the individual Australian year pages.  It only references years commencing with the European colonisation of the country.

Twenty-first century

Twentieth century

Nineteenth century

Eighteenth century

See also 
 Timeline of Adelaide
 Timeline of Brisbane
 Timeline of Gold Coast, Queensland
 Timeline of Melbourne
 Timeline of Sydney
 List of years by country

 
Australia history-related lists
Australia